Ochsenhausen is a city in the district of Biberach, Baden-Württemberg, Germany. It is located between the city of Biberach and Memmingen.  it has a population of 8,916. The mayor of the town is Andreas Denzel.

History
For many centuries, Ochsenhausen Abbey (Reichskloster Ochsenhausen), first mentioned in 1093, was a self -governing prince-abbey within the Holy Roman Empire ruled by a prince-abbot.

In 1803, in the course of the German mediatisation, the abbey was secularized and erected into a secular principality that was then granted to Count Franz Georg Karl von Metternich in compensation for the loss of his immediate fiefs on the left bank of the Rhine after the whole area was annexed by revolutionary France. In 1806, the short-lived principality was annexed to the Kingdom of Württemberg, which in 1871 became part of the German Empire.

The abbey still dominates the town from a hill. Ochsenhausen is called a "Baroque Kingdom of Heaven" ("Himmelreich des Barock") because of the monastic architecture.

Attractions
Every year the Öchsle-Fest takes place. It is named after a historical narrow gauge railway called Öchsle which ran from Ochsenhausen to Warthausen.

Buildings
 Basilica Kirche St. Georg
 Stream Krummbach
 Rathaus, 1606
 Gasthof zur Post, 1650
 Klosterapotheke, 1736
 Chapel Gottesackerkapelle St. Veit, 1679
 Music and cabaret stage Scharfrichterhaus
 Gym Dr.-Hans-Liebherr-Sporthalle, 2010

Notable people
 Anton Schranz (1769 – 1839), head of the Schranz family of artists who worked in Minorca, Malta, Egypt, Athens, Greece and Turkey 
 Joseph Ersing (1882–1956), politician (Centre Party (Germany), CDU), Member of Reichstag, Member of Landtag (Württemberg-Baden)
 Josef Hecht (1882–1956), teacher and conservationist
 Hans-Karl Riedel (1893–1967), entrepreneur and local politician
 Karl Norbert Schmid (1926–1995), organist and composer
 Werner Simmling (born 1944), politician (FDP), member of Bundestag 2009–2013
 Hanns-Friedrich Kunz (born 1945), singer and choir conductor 
 Gerhard Baur (born 1947), mountaineer and camera man
 Hans J. Briegel (born 1962), theoretical physician
 Matthias Dolderer (born 1970), race pilot
 Sandro Cortese (born 1990), motorcycle racer
 Nicole Rolser (born 1992), football player

References

External links
 www.ochsenhausen.de 

Towns in Baden-Württemberg
Biberach (district)
Württemberg